Bywy is an unincorporated community in Choctaw County, Mississippi, United States. Variant names are "Biwyah" and "Wise Store".

History
A post office called Bywy was established in 1880, and remained in operation until 1903. The community takes its name from Bywy Creek.

References

Unincorporated communities in Mississippi
Unincorporated communities in Choctaw County, Mississippi